Aulacomnium acuminatum, commonly called sharp-leaved bog moss or acute-tipped aulacomnium moss, is a species of moss in the family Aulacomniaceae. It is found in Arctic regions of Canada and Alaska in the United States. It grows in calcareous soil in open tundra habitats.

References 

Aulacomniaceae
Bryophyta of North America